The East Providence Branch is a railroad line in Rhode Island and Massachusetts, in the United States. It connects Valley Falls, Rhode Island, to East Providence, Rhode Island, via South Attleboro, Massachusetts, and Pawtucket, Rhode Island. At East Providence, the branch also met the East Junction Branch of the Boston and Providence Railroad and the mainline of the Providence, Warren and Bristol Railroad. Built as a single-track railroad with bridges and the right-of-way prepared for future double-tracking, the line was fully double-tracked from 1892 to 1895; the second track was eventually removed.

The P&W was leased by the New York, Providence and Boston Railroad in 1888; the NYP&B in turn was leased by the New York, New Haven and Hartford Railroad (the New Haven) in 1892. The New Haven operated the branch until its merger into Penn Central Transportation Company at the end of 1968; in February 1973, the P&W broke free of its lease and resumed operations of the branch it had originally built.

The final  of the line were formally abandoned in 2006, with a new connection completed to the East Junction Branch that year. P&W operates local freight train service on the branch.

Route 
The branch begins in Valley Falls, Rhode Island, just south of Valley Falls Yard. It briefly enters Massachusetts in the southwestern corner of South Attleboro, crossing over Interstate 95, before reentering Rhode Island in Pawtucket after crossing over the Northeast Corridor. The line then parallels the George Bennett Highway for several miles, traveling southward in a nearly straight line. The branch continues past the terminus of the highway and enters East Providence, following the east bank of the Seekonk River and crossing the mouth of the Ten Mile River on the Omega Pond Railroad Bridge. Beyond the bridge, the branch curves eastward and connects to the East Junction Branch, via a new track built by the Providence and Worcester Railroad in 2006.

The original route, now abandoned, continues along the Seekonk River, passing under the Henderson Bridge, past the approaches to the disused Crook Point Bascule Bridge, and then beneath the Washington Bridge which carries Interstate 195. The right-of-way ends at the Wilkesbarre Pier by Bold Point.

History

Design and construction 
Initial surveys for a potential branch of the Providence and Worcester Railroad (P&W) to East Providence were completed in December 1867, by prominent Providence civil engineer S. B. Cushing. Cushing subsequently conducted further surveys, though the ultimately chosen route was very similar to that of the first survey.

The East Providence Branch was authorized in 1870 by the Rhode Island General Assembly, via an amendment to the Providence and Worcester Railroad's charter, with corresponding approval from the Massachusetts General Court for a small portion of the branch that entered South Attleboro, Massachusetts. It was to connect the tidewater areas of East Providence (at Bold Point) to the P&W main line in Valley Falls, Rhode Island.

The route was relatively flat, with the greatest incline being  to the mile, or approximately 0.7 percent, in the vicinity of the Mount Saint Mary's Cemetery in Pawtucket.

South of the connection with the Boston and Providence Railroad's East Junction Branch, the remainder of the branch was constructed on land leased from both the B&P and the Providence, Warren and Bristol Railroad in order to reach Wilkesbarre Pier.

While initially single-track, the entire branch was designed and built to allow installation of double-track at a later date. The Providence Evening Press reported that, "The intention is not to construct a road as cheaply as it can be built, but in ballasting, masonry, track and equipments, to make it first-class in every respect." P&W president William Smith Slater (of the prominent Slater family) was a key proponent of the construction of the branch.

By the end of May 1874, significant work had been completed on the line. The first revenue train, a unit train of coal from the docks at India Point, traveled over the branch on September 7, 1874, though final construction, including ballasting, continued. The line was substantially completed in October 1874, with coal trains beginning regular use of the branch the following month. In the spring of 1875, the branch was fully opened to other freight traffic. Residual work on the branch continued until 1878.

Use 

Following the New York, Providence and Boston Railroad's (commonly referred to as the Stonington Line) 1889 lease of the Providence and Worcester Railroad, and the Old Colony Railroad's takeover of both the Boston and Providence and the Providence, Warren and Bristol, the two new operators in the area of the branch came into a dispute about the status of the southern portion of the branch. The Old Colony's president stated the company was happy to allow the Stonington Line to use the southern portion of the branch under the same lease situation as before, but only with a guarantee that the latter would not allow the Old Colony's competition (chiefly the New York and New England Railroad, which connected to Valley Falls) to make use of the branch. In response, the Stonington attempted to use the P&W's charter authority from 1870 to build a new alignment to Wilkesbarre Pier, over Old Colony land, claiming the P&W had technically not built that part of the branch yet. The Old Colony took the Stonington to court, arguing the scheme violated the P&W charter and would disrupt the Old Colony's facilities in the area.

Double-track was installed from Valley Falls to the Darlington neighborhood of Pawtucket in 1892. This was done in part to potentially allow for passenger trains between Woonsocket and Bristol to avoid congestion in Providence entirely, using the East Providence Branch to reach the Providence, Warren and Bristol Railroad, by now also a New Haven subsidiary. The remainder of the branch was double-tracked by the New Haven between 1894 and 1895, at a cost of approximately $18,000 ($ in 2021).

The bankrupt New Haven Railroad was merged into the Penn Central Transportation Company at the end of 1968. Penn Central assumed operations of the P&W, including the East Providence Branch, as ordered by the Interstate Commerce Commission. The P&W still existed as a company, and convinced the Interstate Commerce Commission (ICC) that it should be allowed to separate from the Penn Central merger; several years of legal battles ended with a court order in P&W's favor in December 1972. On February 3, 1973, the East Providence Branch and the rest of the P&W system returned to P&W operation. The Rhode Island Department of Transportation purchased the entire line in 1982 in order to build the Pawtucket Industrial Highway adjacent to the active tracks.

Operations 

Shippers located along the branch are served by a local freight train on weekdays, based out of Valley Falls Yard, just north of the branch's connection to the P&W mainline. This train continues to the East Junction Branch to serve customers as needed.

Most of the grade crossings on the line are protected only by traffic lights, without the flashing lights, bells, and gates typical of grade crossings. P&W and the Rhode Island Department of Transportation have both identified this as a safety hazard.

Station listing

Notes

References 

 
 
 
 

Providence and Worcester Railroad
Rail infrastructure in Rhode Island
Rail infrastructure in Massachusetts
Railway lines opened in 1874